Hydnellum scrobiculatum, commonly known as the ridged tooth, is a tooth fungus in the family Bankeraceae. Widely distributed in the Northern Hemisphere, it is found in Asia, Europe, and North America.

Taxonomy
The fungus was first described as a species of Hydnum by Elias Magnus Fries in his 1815 work Observationes mycologicae. Petter Karsten transferred it to the genus Hydnellum in 1879. Canadian mycologist Kenneth A. Harrison published the variety H. scrobiculatum var. zonatum as a new combination in 1961, but this is now considered to be synonymous with Hydnellum concrescens. Common names given to the species include "pitted corky spine fungus", and the British Mycological Society recommended name "ridged tooth".

Description
These caps can fuse together to form concrescent fruitbodies. The caps have wavy edges, and an initially felty surface that becomes scaly with age. Young fruit bodies are white, then pinkish-brown, then purplish brown, sometimes with white margins. Fruitbodies can become shiny in age.

The spines on the cap underside are up to 4 mm long. They are initially white, but become purplish brown in maturity. The spines are decurrent—they run down the length of the stipe. Mycelium at the base of the stipe envelops and grows around forest litter. The flesh smells mealy (similar to freshly ground flour). The edibility of the fruitbody was previously unknown, but Roger Phillips calls it "poor". In general, Hydnellum species are too acrid and woody to be palatable.

Like all Hydnellum species, H. scrobiculatum produces a brown spore print. Individual spores have a more or less spherical shape, with dimensions of 5.5–6.5 by 4–5.6 μm. They have wart-like projections (tubercles) on the surface. The basidia (spore-bearing cells) are narrowly club-shaped, four-spored, and measure 23–29 by 5–6.5 μm.

Similar species
There are several species that Hydnellum scrobiculatum is often confused with—especially older specimens. These include H. spongiosipes, H. ferrugineum, and H. concrescens. The latter species is particularly similar to H. scrobiculatum, a fact that has been highlighted by conservation efforts in the UK.

Habitat and distribution
Hydnellum scrobiculatum fruits singly, in clusters, or in fused groups in both coniferous and mixed forest. It is found in Asia, Europe, and North America. In the United Kingdom, it is considered vulnerable according to the biodiversity action plan for stiped hydnoid fungi, and endangered according to the Red Data List.

References

Further reading
info from here

External links

Fungi described in 1815
Fungi of Asia
Fungi of Europe
Fungi of North America
scrobiculatum
Taxa named by Elias Magnus Fries